5th arrondissement is an arrondissement in the Littoral department of Benin. It is an administrative division under the jurisdiction of the commune of Cotonou. According to the population census conducted by the Institut National de la Statistique Benin on February 15, 2002, the arrondissement had a total population of 32,864.

References

Populated places in the Littoral Department
Arrondissements of Benin